Nightcap is a Canadian comedy and variety television series which aired on CBC Television from 1963 to 1967.

Premise
This series featured satire and music sketches on topical issues in the news and society with regular performers Bonnie Brooks, Jean Christopher (until 1965), Alan Hamel, Vanda King (after 1965), June Sampson and Billy Van. The Rubber Band was the series' musical quintet, featuring Guido Basso who often performed in segments with the other regulars. The series also featured interviews, serious and not, with famous guests as well as a soap opera parody, "Flemingdon Park", "A cesspool of desire in the heart of suburbia", named after a suburban Toronto neighbourhood. Flemingdon Park was spun-off as a six-part television series in 1967.

Scheduling
This approximately hour-long series was broadcast 39 weeks a year on Wednesdays at approximately 11:37 p.m. (Eastern) from 2 October 1963 to 16 June 1965. The time slot was moved to Tuesdays at 11:41 p.m. from 5 October 1965 to 28 June 1966. The time slot was returned to late Wednesday nights, 11:45 p.m. for its final season from 19 October 1966 to 31 May 1967.

Initially the broadcasts were confined to Toronto and other Ontario cities such as Barrie, London and Windsor. By 1966, the series could be seen in Montreal, Ottawa, Pembroke, Quebec City and Vancouver.

Reception
Montreal Gazette television critic Bernard Dubé described the series as "wild, corny, raunchy, lively and irreverent". Roy Shields, a Toronto columnist, panned the series as "the worst TV show in the world."

References

External links
 

1963 Canadian television series debuts
1967 Canadian television series endings
Canadian late-night television programming
CBC Television original programming
1960s Canadian sketch comedy television series
Canadian news parodies
1960s Canadian variety television series